The 1994 Dutch TT was the seventh round of the 1994 Grand Prix motorcycle racing season. It took place on 25 June 1994 at the TT Circuit Assen located in Assen, Netherlands.

500 cc classification

250 cc classification

 Alessandro Gramigni suffered a shoulder injury in a crash during practice and withdrew from the event.

125 cc classification

 Bruno Casanova suffered a broken leg in a crash during practice and missed the remainder of the season.
 Oliver Koch suffered a broken arm & collarbone in a crash during practice and missed the next three rounds of the season.

References

Dutch TT
Dutch
Tourist Trophy